Spectre is a 2015 spy film and the twenty-fourth in the James Bond series produced by Eon Productions for Metro-Goldwyn-Mayer and Columbia Pictures. Directed by Sam Mendes and written by Neal Purvis, Robert Wade, John Logan, and Jez Butterworth, it stars Daniel Craig as Bond, alongside Christoph Waltz, Léa Seydoux, Ben Whishaw, Naomie Harris, Dave Bautista, Monica Bellucci, and Ralph Fiennes. In the film, Bond learns of Spectre, an international crime organisation led by Ernst Stavro Blofeld (Waltz).

Despite initially stating he would not direct Spectre, Mendes confirmed his return in 2014 after Nicolas Winding Refn declined to direct; Mendes became the first to direct successive James Bond films since John Glen. The inclusion of Spectre and its associated characters marked the end of the Thunderball controversy, in which Kevin McClory and Fleming were embroiled in lengthy legal disputes over the film rights to the novel; Spectre is the first film to feature these elements since Diamonds Are Forever (1971). Following the Sony Pictures hack, it was revealed Sony and Eon clashed regarding finance, stunts, and filming locations; Spectre is estimated to have a final budget of $245–300 million, making it one of the most expensive films ever made. Principal photography began in December 2014 and lasted until July 2015, with filming locations including Austria, the United Kingdom, Italy, Morocco, and Mexico.

Spectre premiered at the Royal Albert Hall on 26 October 2015 and was theatrically released in conventional and IMAX formats in the United Kingdom that day, and in the United States on 6 November. The film received mixed reviews from critics, who praised the action sequences, cast performances (particularly Craig's and Bautista's), and the musical score, but criticised the pacing and formulaic narrative decisions. It grossed $880 million worldwide, making it the sixth-highest grossing film of 2015 and the second-highest grossing James Bond film after Skyfall, unadjusted for inflation. The film's theme song, "Writing's on the Wall," won an Academy Award and Golden Globe for Best Original Song. The next film in the series, No Time to Die, was released in 2021.

Plot 
In Mexico City on the Day of the Dead, MI6 agent James Bond wreaks havoc foiling a terrorist bombing plot, follows the leader, Marco Sciarra, onto his escaping helicopter, throws Sciarra and the pilot to their deaths and flies away, examining the stylised octopus on Sciarra's ring.

In London, Gareth Mallory, the current M, suspends Bond for his unauthorized action. M is engaged in a power struggle with Max Denbigh (whom Bond dubs "C"), the Director-General of the new, privately backed Joint Intelligence Service formed by the merger of MI5 and MI6. C campaigns for Britain to join the global surveillance and intelligence initiative "Nine Eyes," and close down the “outdated”  '00' section. In private, Bond shows Eve Moneypenny a video delivered to him after the previous M's death, ordering him to kill  Sciarra. Moneypenny agrees to help Bond secretly, as does Q.

Bond follows the previous M's orders, attending Sciarra's funeral in Rome. He saves Sciarra's widow, Lucia, from two assassins. They make love, and she tells him Sciarra belonged to a powerful and deadly international organisation. Bond uses Sciarra's ring to infiltrate a meeting.  One piece of business is the assassination of the "Pale King." Suddenly, the leader, Franz Oberhauser, greets James, who flees across the city in the souped up car he “borrowed” from Q, pursued by Hinx. Bond calls Moneypenny, who identifies the Pale King as Mr White, a former member of the organisation's subsidiary, Quantum, who had fallen afoul of Oberhauser—presumed dead 20 years earlier.

White is dying of thallium poisoning in Altaussee, Austria. Bond offers to protect his daughter. White tells Bond she will take him to “L'Américain,” and commits suicide. Bond finds psychiatrist Madeleine Swann, who refuses to listen to him until Bond rescues her from Hinx and his forces. The pair meet Q, who identifes Le Chiffre, Dominic Greene and Raoul Silva as agents of the same organisation, headed by Oberhauser. Swann names it: Spectre. 

Swann takes Bond to L'Américain, a hotel in Tangier, where a secret room directs them to Oberhauser's base in the Sahara. On a train to a remote station, Hinx attacks them. In the ensuing fight, Bond strangles and ejects him. At  Oberhauser's base they learn that Spectre is behind  the Joint Intelligence Service and the Nine Eyes programme. Oberhauser now has access to everything—including M's briefing of MI6. C is complicit. He will give Spectre unlimited access to intelligence gathered by Nine Eyes. Oberhauser boasts of the way their paths have crossed, asking Bond if he thought it was a coincidence that all the women in his life ended up dead. He plays a recording of Swann's father's suicide. 

While Oberhauser probes Bond's brain, he discusses their shared history. After Bond was orphaned, Oberhauser's father, Hannes, became his temporary guardian. Jealous of his father's affection for Bond, Oberhauser killed his father, staged his own death, and adopted the name Ernst Stavro Blofeld. He went on to form Spectre and target Bond. Oberhauser removes a white cat that jumps onto Bond's lap.

Bond and Swann stun Blofeld using an explosive wristwatch. The entire complex burns, and they escape to London to prevent Nine Eyes from going online.

In London, Bond and Swann meet M, Q, Bill Tanner and Moneypenny, planning to arrest C. Swann and Bond are separately abducted by Spectre operatives. The rest proceed with the plan. After Q stops Nine Eyes from going online, a struggle between M and C ends with C falling to his death. Bond is taken to the ruins of the old MI6 building, scheduled for demolition after Silva's bombing. Blofeld—the right side of his face badly scarred—tells Bond that he has three minutes to escape, or he can die trying to save Swann. Bond finds Swann and they escape by boat as the building collapses. Bond shoots down Blofeld's helicopter, which crashes onto Westminster Bridge. Blofeld manages to crawl away from the wreckage. He dares Bond to kill him, but Bond refuses, leaving him to be arrested by M. Bond reunites with Swann.

Later, Bond acquires his rebuilt Aston Martin DB5 from Q and drives away with Swann.

Cast
 Daniel Craig as James Bond, agent 007. The director Sam Mendes has described Bond as being extremely focused in Spectre, likening his new-found dedication to hunting.
 Christoph Waltz as Ernst Stavro Blofeld (born Franz Oberhauser), Bond's nemesis and the mysterious mastermind behind Spectre, as well as the puppeteer responsible for a series of recent events in Bond's life, motivated by a longstanding grudge against him.
 Léa Seydoux as Madeleine Swann, a psychiatrist working at a private medical clinic in the Austrian Alps, and the daughter of Mr White.
 Ben Whishaw as Q, MI6 quartermaster who outfits Bond with equipment for use in the field.
 Naomie Harris as Eve Moneypenny, a former agent who left the field to become M's assistant.
 Dave Bautista as Mr Hinx, Spectre's top assassin.
 Andrew Scott as C (Max Denbigh), head of the new joint intelligence service and an agent for Spectre, heavily involved with their plan to merge nine national intelligence agencies into the Nine Eyes Committee, allowing Spectre the power to take over the world.
 Rory Kinnear as Bill Tanner, M's chief of staff.
 Jesper Christensen as Mr White, a fugitive from MI6 and a former senior figure in Spectre's Quantum subsidiary, as portrayed in Casino Royale and Quantum of Solace, now dying from thallium poisoning after falling from Spectre's favour over his reservations relating to human trafficking.
 Monica Bellucci as Lucia Sciarra, the Italian wife of assassin Marco Sciarra.
 Ralph Fiennes as M (Gareth Mallory), head of MI6.
 Stephanie Sigman as Estrella, a Mexican agent who accompanies Bond on his mission to assassinate Marco Sciarra.
 Alessandro Cremona as Marco Sciarra, an Italian Spectre agent whom Bond kills in the pre-title sequence of the movie.
 Judi Dench as Mallory's predecessor M, who posthumously gives Bond his mission. This film marks Dench's eighth and final as appearance as M, 20 years after beginning with GoldenEye.

Production

Pre-production
In March 2013, Mendes said he would not return to direct the next film in the series, then known as Bond 24; he later recanted and announced that he would return, as he found the script and the plans for the long-term future of the franchise appealing. Nicolas Winding Refn would later reveal that he turned down an offer to direct the film. In directing Skyfall and Spectre, Mendes became the first director to oversee two successive Bond films since John Glen directed five consecutive films, ending with Licence to Kill in 1989. Dennis Gassner returned as the film's production designer, while cinematographer Hoyte van Hoytema took over from Roger Deakins. In July 2015 Mendes noted that the combined crew of Spectre numbered over one thousand, making it a larger production than Skyfall. Craig is listed as co-producer. He considered the credit a high point of his career, saying, "I'm just so proud of the fact that my name comes up somewhere else on the titles."

The film's usage of the Spectre organisation and its characters marked the end of long-standing litigation between Eon Productions and producer Kevin McClory, who sued James Bond creator Ian Fleming in 1961 claiming ownership over elements of the novel Thunderball, and in an out of court settlement two years later, was awarded the novel's film rights, including Spectre and its characters. McClory died in 2006, and in November 2013 MGM and the McClory estate formally settled the issue with Danjaq, sister company of Eon Productions—with MGM acquiring the full copyright film rights to the concept of Spectre and all of the characters associated with it. It has been suggested that with the acquisition of the film rights and the organisation's re-introduction to the series' continuity, the SPECTRE acronym was discarded and the organisation reimagined as "Spectre".

When Sony Pictures Entertainment renegotiated with Metro-Goldwyn-Mayer Pictures the deal to co-finance the Bond franchise in 2011, they were tasked to provide 25% of the negative cost of both Skyfall and Spectre,  in exchange for receiving 25% of the profits plus distribution fees for overseeing its worldwide rollout. When the film was announced in June 2013, the budget was not yet fixed, but was certain to be higher than the $210 million of Skyfall due to foreign locations and bigger payments for Mendes and Craig. In November 2014, Sony was targeted by hackers who released details of confidential e-mails between Sony executives regarding several high-profile film projects. Included within these were several memos relating to the production of Spectre, claiming that the film was over budget, detailing early drafts of the script written by John Logan, and expressing Sony's frustration with the project. Eon Productions later issued a statement confirming the leak of what they called "an early version of the screenplay". Eon resisted Sony and MGM's arguments to cut down on stunts and location work to reduce the budget, but managed to secure tax incentives and rebates, such as $14 million from Mexico. Spectre has a final budget estimated between $250 million and $275 million.

Writing
Spectre marked the return of many scriptwriters from the previous Bond films, such as Skyfall writer John Logan; Neal Purvis and Robert Wade, who had done work in five previous Bond films, and British playwright Jez Butterworth, who had previously made uncredited contributions to Skyfall. Butterworth was brought in to polish the script, being helped by Mendes and Craig. Butterworth considered that his changes involved adding what he would like to see as a teenager, and limited the scenes with Bond talking to men, as "Bond shoots other men—he doesn't sit around chatting to them. So you put a line through that." With the acquisition of the rights to Spectre and its associated characters, Purvis and Wade revealed that the film would provide a minor retcon to the continuity of the previous films, with the Quantum organisation alluded to in Casino Royale and introduced in Quantum of Solace reimagined as a division within Spectre rather than an independent organisation which is implied to be no longer active by the film's events. The plot of Spectre also linked the events of Skyfall to Craig's first two Bond movies by revealing antagonist Raoul Silva to be associated with Spectre reverting Skyfalls initial solo story status. Various plot ideas were discussed and discarded during the writing process; Ralph Fiennes revealed in a 2021 podcast interview that at one stage Sam Mendes suggested a plot twist revealing M to be the villain, which Fiennes vetoed. Another draft by John Logan had MI6 chief of staff Bill Tanner uncovered as a Spectre mole.

Despite being an original story, Spectre draws on Ian Fleming's source material, most notably in the character of Franz Oberhauser, played by Christoph Waltz, and his father Hannes. Hannes Oberhauser is a background character in the short story "Octopussy" from the Octopussy and The Living Daylights collection, and is named in the film as having been a temporary legal guardian of a young Bond in 1983. As Sam Mendes searched for events in young Bond's life to follow the childhood discussed in Skyfall, he came across Hannes Oberhauser, who becomes a father figure to Bond. From there, Mendes conceived the idea of "a natural child who had been pushed out, cuckoo in the nest" by Bond, which became Franz. Similarly, Charmian Bond is shown to have been his full-time guardian, observing the back story established by Fleming.

Casting

The main cast was revealed in December 2014 at the 007 Stage at Pinewood Studios. Daniel Craig returned for his fourth appearance as James Bond, while Ralph Fiennes, Naomie Harris and Ben Whishaw reprised their roles as M, Eve Moneypenny and Q respectively, having been established in Skyfall. Rory Kinnear also reprised his role as Bill Tanner in his third appearance in the series.

Christoph Waltz was cast in the role of Franz Oberhauser, though he refused to comment on the nature of the part. It was later revealed with the film's release that he is Ernst Stavro Blofeld. Waltz got interested in the film for dealing with technology-assisted mass surveillance, "speaking about relevant social issues in a way that few Bonds have done before", and denied rumours that the role was written specially for him, but added that "when I came on board, the role grew, evolved, and mutated."

Dave Bautista was cast as Mr Hinx after producers sought an actor with a background in contact sports. The character only has one line in the entire film, "Shit". Sam Mendes thought the silent nature would drive Bautista away, but the lifelong Bond fan expressed interest in reviving the quiet henchman archetype of characters such as Jaws. Bautista's performance was inspired mostly by Oddjob from Goldfinger, and said not talking created an acting challenge, "trying to find this way where I am actually going to have to speak without speaking." After casting Bérénice Marlohe, a relative newcomer, as Sévérine in Skyfall, Mendes sought out a more experienced actor for the role of Madeleine Swann, ultimately casting Léa Seydoux in the role. Monica Bellucci joined the cast as Lucia Sciarra, becoming, at the age of fifty, the oldest actress to be cast as a Bond girl. She had previously auditioned for the role of Paris Carver in Tomorrow Never Dies, but was passed over in favour of Teri Hatcher. In a separate interview with Danish website Euroman, Jesper Christensen revealed he would be reprising his role as Mr White from Casino Royale and Quantum of Solace. Christensen's character was reportedly killed off in a scene intended to be used as an epilogue to Quantum of Solace, before it was removed from the final cut of the film, enabling his return in Spectre.

In addition to the principal cast, Alessandro Cremona was cast as Marco Sciarra, Stephanie Sigman was cast as Estrella, and Detlef Bothe was cast as a villain for scenes shot in Austria. In February 2015 over 1,500 background artistes were hired for the pre-title sequence set in Mexico, though they were replicated in the film, giving the effect of around 10,000 extras.

Filming
Mendes revealed that production would begin on 8 December 2014 at Pinewood Studios, with filming taking seven months. Mendes also confirmed several filming locations, including London, Mexico City and Rome. Van Hoytema shot the film mostly on Kodak 35mm film stock (in addition to digital cameras such as the 6K Arri Alexa 65mm), in contrast to Skyfall being filmed solely on digital cameras. Early filming took place at Pinewood Studios, and around London, with scenes variously featuring Craig and Harris at Bond's flat, and Craig and Kinnear travelling down the River Thames.

Filming was carried out in Austria between December 2014 and February 2015, with production taking place in the area around Sölden—including the Ötztal Glacier Road, Rettenbach glacier and the adjacent ski resort plus cable car station—Obertilliach and Lake Altaussee. Scenes filmed in Austria centred on the Ice Q Restaurant, standing in for the fictional Hoffler Klinik, a private medical clinic in the Austrian Alps. Filming included an action scene featuring a Land Rover Defender Bigfoot and a Range Rover Sport. Various airplane models were used in filming, from a life-sized plane with detachable wings to film the crash in the woods, to plane fuselages either built atop snowmobiles or shot from nitrogen cannons. Production was temporarily halted first by an injury to Craig, who suffered a meniscus tear whilst shooting a fight scene with Bautista, and later by an accident involving a filming vehicle that saw three crew members injured, at least one of them seriously.

Filming temporarily returned to England to shoot scenes at Blenheim Palace in Oxfordshire, which stood in for a location in Rome, before moving on to the city itself for a five-week shoot across the city, with locations including the Ponte Sisto bridge and the Roman Forum. The production faced opposition from a variety of special interest groups and city authorities, who were concerned about the potential for damage to historical sites around the city, and problems with graffiti and rubbish appearing in the film. Special effects supervisor Chris Corbould stated the scenes had to be extensively planned prior to filming specially to avoid any mishaps, going to the point of building protection above steps where cars would drive. A car chase scene set along the banks of the Tiber River and through the streets of Rome featured an Aston Martin DB10 (a model developed especially for the film, with only 10 examples produced) and a Jaguar C-X75. The C-X75 was originally developed as a hybrid electric vehicle with four independent electric engines powered by two jet turbines, before the project was cancelled. The version used for filming was converted to use a conventional internal combustion engine, to minimise the potential for disruption from mechanical problems with the complex hybrid system. The C-X75s used for filming were developed by the engineering division of Formula One racing team Williams, who built the original C-X75 prototype for Jaguar. Remote driving pods were built above the cars so the vehicles could be driven while the cameras focused on Craig and Bautista in the steering wheel. According to chief stunt co-ordinator Gary Powell, filming the chase had the "risk of skidding into the Vatican", and led to "a record for smashing up cars in Spectre—seven Aston Martins in all," with the film's car expenses estimated at £24 million ($48 million).

With filming completed in Rome, production moved to Mexico City in late March to shoot the film's opening sequence, with scenes to include the Day of the Dead festival filmed in and around the Zócalo and the Centro Histórico district. At the time, no such Day of the Dead parade like the one from the film took place in Mexico City; in 2016, due to the interest raised by Spectre and the government's desire to promote the pre-Hispanic Mexican culture, the federal and local authorities decided to organise an actual "Día de Muertos" parade through Paseo de la Reforma and Centro Histórico on 29 October 2016, which was attended by 250,000 people.  The film opens with a long take that joins six shots seamlessly, and was one of the few scenes that required previsualisation. Through extensive planning, filming did not require motion control cameras. The scene joints were done in post-production through re-timing and re-projections, which even matched Mexico locations with interiors filmed at Pinewood.

The planned scenes required the city square to be closed for filming a sequence involving a fight aboard a Messerschmitt-Bölkow-Blohm Bo 105CBS helicopter flown by stunt pilot Chuck Aaron, which called for modifications to be made to several buildings to prevent damage. This particular scene in Mexico required 1,500 extras, 10 giant skeletons and 250,000 paper flowers. Reports in the Mexican media added that the film's second unit would move to Palenque in the state of Chiapas, to film aerial manoeuvres considered too dangerous to shoot in an urban area. These were pasted over a computer-generated square and crowd below the helicopter, with motion capture doubles fighting inside. Mendes and the effects team felt that this approach "would get believable composition and movement" compared to adding a digital helicopter above the Mexico City location. Following filming in Mexico, and during a scheduled break, Craig was flown to New York to undergo minor surgery to fix his knee injury. It was reported that filming was not affected and he had returned to filming at Pinewood Studios as planned on 22 April. Nonetheless, some parts of the Mexico scene were done with stunt doubles, whose faces were digitally replaced with Craig's.

On 17 May 2015 filming took place on the Thames in London. Stunt scenes involving Craig and Seydoux on a speedboat as well as a low flying helicopter near Westminster Bridge were shot at night, with filming temporarily closing both Westminster and Lambeth Bridges. Scenes were also shot on the river near MI6's headquarters at Vauxhall Cross. The crew returned to the river less than a week later to film scenes solely set on Westminster Bridge. The London Fire Brigade was on set to simulate rain as well as monitor smoke used for filming. Craig, Seydoux, and Waltz, as well as Harris and Fiennes, were seen being filmed. Prior to this, scenes involving Fiennes were shot at a restaurant in Covent Garden. Blofeld's helicopter crash was done with two full sized helicopter shells, which were rigged with steelwork and an overhead track. Computer-generated rotor blades and scenery damage were added in post-production. The MI6 building, which in the film is vacated and scheduled for demolition following the terrorist attack from Skyfall, was replaced in the production plates for a digital reconstruction. When the building is detonated, it is a combination of both a miniature and a breakaway version of the digital building.

After wrapping up in England, production travelled to Morocco in June, with filming taking place in Oujda, Tangier and Erfoud, after preliminary work was completed by the production's second unit. The headquarters of Spectre in Morocco was located in Gara Medouar which is a 'crater' caused by erosion and of neither volcanic nor impact origin. An explosion filmed in Morocco holds a Guinness World Record for the largest film stunt explosion in cinematic history, involving 8,140 litres of kerosene and 24 charges each with a kilogramme of high explosives. The outside shots of a train in a desert featured the Oriental Desert Express. Principal photography concluded on 5 July 2015. A wrap-up party for Spectre was held in commemoration before entering post-production. Filming took 128 days.

Whilst filming in Mexico City, speculation in the media claimed that the script had been altered to accommodate the demands of Mexican authorities—reportedly influencing details of the scene and characters, casting choices, and modifying the script to portray the country in a "positive light"—to secure tax concessions and financial support worth up to $20 million for the film. This was denied by producer Michael G. Wilson, who stated that the scene had always been intended to be shot in Mexico as production had been attracted to the imagery of the Day of the Dead, and that the script had been developed from there. Production of Skyfall had previously faced similar problems while attempting to secure permits to shoot the film's pre-title sequence in India before moving to Istanbul.

Five companies did the visual effects—Industrial Light & Magic, Double Negative, Moving Picture Company, Cinesite and Peerless—under the supervision of Steve Begg. The computer-generated effects included set extensions, digital touches on the vehicles, and crumbling buildings. A sixth one, Framestore, handled the title sequence, the seventh in the series designed by Daniel Kleinman. It took four months to complete, and centred on an octopus motif reminiscent of the Spectre logo, along with images of love and relationships.

Soundtrack

Thomas Newman returned as Spectres composer. Rather than composing the score once the film had moved into post-production, Newman worked during filming. The theatrical trailer released in July 2015 contained a rendition of John Barry's On Her Majesty's Secret Service theme. Mendes stated that the final film would have more than 100 minutes of music. The soundtrack album was released on 23 October 2015 in the UK and 6 November 2015 in the US on Decca Records.

The English band Radiohead were commissioned to write the title song, and submitted "Man of War", an unreleased song written in the 1990s. It was rejected as it had not been written for the film and so was ineligible for the Academy Award for Best Original Song. Radiohead recorded another song for the film, "Spectre", but this was also rejected as too melancholy.

In September 2015, Eon announced that Sam Smith had recorded the title theme, "Writing's on the Wall". Smith reported writing the song in a single session with regular collaborator Jimmy Napes in under half an hour before recording a demo. Satisfied with the quality, the filmmakers used the demo in the final release. "Writing's on the Wall" was released as a download on 25 September 2015. It received mixed reviews from critics and fans, particularly in comparison to Adele's "Skyfall", leading to Shirley Bassey trending on Twitter on the day it was released. Despite the mixed reception, it became the first Bond theme to reach number one in the UK Singles Chart, the second to win the Academy Award for Best Original Song, and the fifth to be nominated. It also won the Golden Globe Award for Best Original Song at the 73rd Golden Globe Awards.

Marketing

During the December 2014 press conference announcing the start of filming, Aston Martin and Eon unveiled the new DB10 as the official car for the film. The DB10 was designed in collaboration between Aston Martin and the filmmakers, with only 10 being produced especially for Spectre as a celebration of the 50th anniversary of the company's association with the franchise. Only eight of those 10 were used for the film, however; the remaining two were used for promotional work. After modifying the Jaguar C-X75 for the film, Williams F1 carried the 007 logo on their cars at the 2015 Mexican Grand Prix, with the team playing host to the cast and crew ahead of the Mexican premiere of the film.

To promote the film, the film's marketers continued the trend established during Skyfalls production of releasing still images of clapperboards and video blogs on Eon's official social media accounts.

On 13 March 2015, several members of the cast and crew, including Craig, Whishaw, Wilson and Mendes, as well as previous James Bond actor, Sir Roger Moore, appeared in a sketch written by David Walliams and the Dawson Brothers for Comic Relief's Red Nose Day on BBC One. In the sketch, they film a behind-the-scenes documentary on the filming of Spectre. The first teaser trailer for Spectre was released worldwide in March 2015, followed by the theatrical trailer in July and the final trailer in October.

Release

Theatrical

Spectre had its world premiere at the Royal Film Performance, an event in aid of the Film & TV Charity, in London on 26 October 2015 at the Royal Albert Hall, the same day as its general release in the United Kingdom and Republic of Ireland. Following the announcement of the start of filming, Paramount Pictures brought forward the release of Mission: Impossible – Rogue Nation to avoid competing with Spectre. In March 2015 IMAX corporation announced that Spectre would be screened in its cinemas, following Skyfalls success with the company. In the UK it received a wider release than Skyfall, with a minimum of 647 cinemas including 40 IMAX screens, compared to Skyfalls 587 locations and 21 IMAX screens.

Home media
Spectre was released for Digital HD on 22 January 2016 and on DVD and Blu-ray on 9 and 22 February 2016 in the US and UK respectively. It debuted atop the home video charts in both countries, and finished 2016 with 1.5 million units in the UK, the second best-selling title of the year, behind only Star Wars: The Force Awakens, and 2 million copies in the US, 12th in the year-end charts.

The film was later released on Ultra HD Blu-ray on 22 October 2019 by 20th Century Fox Home Entertainment along with the previous three films, and standalone on 25 February 2020 in the US and 23 March 2020 in the UK.

Reception

Box office
Spectre grossed $880.7 million worldwide; $135.5 million of the takings were generated from the UK market and $200.1 million from North America. Worldwide, this made it the second-highest-grossing James Bond film after Skyfall, and the sixth-highest-grossing film of 2015. Deadline Hollywood calculated the film's net profit as $98.4 million, accounting for production budgets, marketing, talent participations, and other costs; box office grosses and home media revenues placed it sixteenth on their list of 2015's "Most Valuable Blockbusters". Sony had expected the net profit of the film to be around $38 million had it performed to the same level of its predecessor, but it earned 20% less than Skyfall. Sony paid 50% of the production costs for the film—which totalled some $250 million after accounting for government incentives—but received only 25% of certain profits, once costs were recouped. The studio also spent tens of millions of dollars in marketing and had to give MGM some of the profit from the studio's non-Bond films, including 22 Jump Street.

In the United Kingdom, the film grossed £4.1 million ($6.4 million) from its Monday preview screenings. It grossed £6.3 million ($9.2 million) on its opening day and then £5.7 million ($8.8 million) on Wednesday, setting UK records for both days. In the film's first seven days it grossed £41.7 million ($63.8 million), breaking the UK record for highest first-week opening, set by Harry Potter and the Prisoner of Azkabans £23.9 million ($36.9 million) in 2004.<ref>{{cite web|title=Spectre breaks UK Box Office Records: The biggest UK opening of all time |url=http://www.007.com/spectre-breaks-box-office-records/ |archive-url=https://web.archive.org/web/20170930114953/http://www.007.com/spectre-breaks-box-office-records/ |archive-date= 30 September 2017 |publisher=007 |date=2 November 2015 |access-date=6 November 2015 |url-status=dead }}</ref> Its Friday–Saturday gross was £20.4 million ($31.2 million) compared to Skyfalls £20.1 million ($31 million). The film also broke the record for the best per-screen opening average with $110,000, a record previously held by The Dark Knight with $100,200. It has grossed a total of $136.3 million there. In the UK, it surpassed Avatar to become the country's highest-grossing IMAX release ever with $10.09 million.Spectre opened in Germany with $22.5 million (including previews), which included a new record for the biggest Saturday of all time, Australia with $8.7 million (including previews) and South Korea opened to $8.2 million (including previews). Despite the 13 November Paris attacks, which led to numerous theatres being closed down, the film opened with $14.6 million (including $2 million in previews) in France. In Mexico, where part of the film was shot, it debuted with more than double that of Skyfall with $4.5 million. It also bested its predecessor's opening in various Nordic regions where MGM is distributing, such as in Finland ($2.7 million) and Norway ($2.9 million), and in other markets like Denmark  ($4.2 million), the Netherlands ($3.4 million), and Sweden ($3.1 million). In India, it opened at No. 1 with $4.8 million which is 4% above the opening of Skyfall. It topped the German-speaking Switzerland box office for four weeks and in the Netherlands, it held the No. 1 spot for seven weeks straight where it topped Minions to become the top movie of the year. The top earning markets are Germany ($70.3 million) and France ($38.8 million). In Paris, it has the second-highest ticket sales of all time with 4.1 million tickets sold only behind Spider-Man 3 which sold over 6.3 million tickets in 2007.

In the United States and Canada the film opened on 6 November 2015, and in its opening weekend, was originally projected to gross $70–75 million from 3,927 screens, the widest release for a Bond film. However, after it grossed $5.3 million from its early Thursday night showings and $28 million on its opening day, weekend projections were increased to $75–80 million. The film ended up grossing $70.4 million in its opening weekend (about $20 million less than Skyfall's $90.6 million debut, including IMAX previews), but nevertheless finished first at the box office. IMAX generated $9.1 million for Spectre at 374 screens, premium large format made $8 million from 429 cinemas, reaping 11% of the film's opening, which means that Spectre earned $17.1 million (23%) of its opening weekend total in large-format venues. Cinemark XD generated $1.9 million in 112 XD locations.

In China, it opened on 12 November and earned $15 million on its opening day, which is the second biggest 2D single day gross for a Hollywood film behind the $18.5 million opening day of Mission: Impossible – Rogue Nation and occupying 43% of all available screens which included $790,000 in advance night screenings. Through its opening weekend, it earned $48.1 million from 14,700 screens which is 198% ahead of Skyfall, a new record for a Hollywood 2D opening. IMAX contributed $4.6 million on 246 screens, also a new record for a three-day opening for a November release (breaking Interstellars record). In its second weekend, it added $12.1 million falling precipitously by 75% which is the second worst second weekend drop for any major Hollywood release in China of 2015. It grossed a total of $84.7 million there after four weekends (foreign films in the Middle Kingdom play for 30 days only, unless granted special extensions). Despite a strong opening, it failed to attain the $100 million mark there as projected due to mixed response from critics and audiences as well as facing competition from local films.

Its critical consensus reads, "Spectre nudges Daniel Craig's rebooted Bond closer to the glorious, action-driven spectacle of earlier entries, although it's admittedly reliant on established 007 formula." Metacritic (which uses a weighted average) assigned Spectre a score of 60 out of 100 based on 48 critics, indicating "mixed or average reviews". Audiences polled by CinemaScore gave the film an average grade of "A−" on an A+ to F scale.

Prior to its UK release, Spectre mostly received positive reviews. Mark Kermode, film critic for The Observer, gave the film four out of five stars, observing that the film did not live up to the standard set by Skyfall, but was able to tap into audience expectations. Writing in The Guardian, Peter Bradshaw gave the film a full five stars, calling it "inventive, intelligent and complex", and singling out Craig's performance as the film's highlight. In another five star review, The Daily Telegraphs Robbie Collin described Spectre as "a swaggering show of confidence'", lauding it as "a feat of pure cinematic necromancy." Positive yet critical assessments included Kim Newman of Sight and Sound, who wrote that "for all its wayward plotting (including an unhelpful tie-in with Bond's childhood that makes very little sense) and off-the-peg elements, Spectre works" as he felt "the audience's patience gets tested by two and a half hours of set-pieces strung on one of the series' thinner plots"; and IGN's Chris Tilly, who rated the film 7.2 out of 10, considering Spectre "solid if unspectacular", and concluding that "the film falls frustratingly short of greatness."

Critical appraisal was mixed in the United States. In a review for RogerEbert.com, Matt Zoller Seitz gave Spectre 2.5 out of 4, describing it as inconsistent and unable to capitalise on its potential. Kenneth Turan, reviewing the film for Los Angeles Times, concluded that Spectre "comes off as exhausted and uninspired". Manohla Dargis of The New York Times criticised the film as having "nothing surprising" and sacrificing its originality for the sake of box office returns. Forbes' Scott Mendelson also heavily criticised the film, denouncing Spectre as "the worst 007 movie in 30 years". Darren Franich of Entertainment Weekly viewed Spectre as "an overreaction to our current blockbuster moment", aspiring "to be a serialized sequel" and proving "itself as a Saga". While noting that "[n]othing that happens in Spectre holds up to even minor logical scrutiny", he had "come not to bury Spectre, but to weirdly praise it. Because the final act of the movie is so strange, so willfully obtuse, that it deserves extra attention." Christopher Orr, writing in The Atlantic, also criticised the film, saying that Spectre "backslides on virtually every [aspect]". Lawrence Toppman of The Charlotte Observer called Craig's performance "Bored, James Bored." Alyssa Rosenberg, writing for The Washington Post, stated that the film turned into "a disappointingly conventional Bond film."

In a positive review published in Rolling Stone, Peter Travers gave the film 3.5 stars out of 4, describing Spectre as "party time for Bond fans, a fierce, funny, gorgeously produced valentine to the longest-running franchise in movies". Mick LaSalle from the San Francisco Chronicle, raved that "One of the great satisfactions of Spectre is that, in addition to all the stirring action, and all the timely references to a secret organisation out to steal everyone's personal information, we get to believe in Bond as a person." Stephen Whitty from The New York Daily News, who awarded the film four of five stars, stated that "Craig is cruelly efficient. Dave Bautista makes a good, Oddjob-like assassin. And while Lea Seydoux doesn't leave a huge impression as this film's 'Bond girl', perhaps it's because we've already met—far too briefly—the hypnotic Monica Bellucci, as the first real 'Bond woman' since Diana Rigg." Chicago Sun-Times film reviewer Richard Roeper, who gave the film three stars out of four, considered the film "solidly in the middle of the all-time rankings, which means it's still a slick, beautifully photographed, action-packed, international thriller with a number of wonderfully, ludicrously entertaining set pieces, a sprinkling of dry wit, myriad gorgeous women and a classic psycho-villain who is clearly out of his mind but seems to like it that way." Michael Phillips, reviewing for the Chicago Tribune, stated, "For all its workmanlike devotion to out-of-control helicopters, Spectre works best when everyone's on the ground, doing his or her job, driving expensive fast cars heedlessly, detonating the occasional wisecrack, enjoying themselves and their beautiful clothes." Variety film critic Guy Lodge complained in his review that "What's missing is the unexpected emotional urgency of Skyfall,'' as the film sustains its predecessor's nostalgia kick with a less sentimental bent."

Accolades

Notes

References

External links

 
 
 
 
 
 
 
 

2015 films
2015 action thriller films
2010s spy action films
American spy action films
American action thriller films
American sequel films
British spy action films
British action thriller films
British sequel films
Columbia Pictures films
2010s English-language films
Films scored by Thomas Newman
British films about revenge
Films about security and surveillance
Films about terrorism in Europe
Films directed by Sam Mendes
Films produced by Barbara Broccoli
Films produced by Michael G. Wilson
Films set in Africa
Films set in Austria
Films set in the Alps
Films set in London
Films set in Mexico City
Films set in Morocco
Films set in Tangier
Films set in Rome
Films set in Tokyo
Films set in Vatican City
Films shot in Austria
Films shot in England
Films shot in London
Films shot in Mexico City
Films shot in Monaco
Films shot in Morocco
Films shot in Rome
Films set in 2015
Films that won the Best Original Song Academy Award
IMAX films
Day of the Dead films
James Bond films
Metro-Goldwyn-Mayer films
Patricide in fiction
Torture in films
Films shot at Pinewood Studios
Films with screenplays by John Logan
Eon Productions films
Films with screenplays by Neal Purvis and Robert Wade
Films with screenplays by Jez Butterworth
Films about terrorism in Africa
2010s American films
Films set in the Sahara
2010s British films